The following lists events that happened during 2000 in China.

Incumbents 
 Party General Secretary – Jiang Zemin
 President – Jiang Zemin
 Premier – Zhu Rongji
 Vice President – Hu Jintao
 Vice Premier – Li Lanqing
 Congress Chairman – Li Peng
 Conference Chairman – Li Ruihuan

Governors  
 Governor of Anhui Province – Wang Taihua then Xu Zhonglin
 Governor of Fujian Province – Xi Jinping 
 Governor of Gansu Province – Song Zhaosu 
 Governor of Guangdong Province – Lu Ruihua 
 Governor of Guizhou Province – Qian Yunlu 
 Governor of Hainan Province – Wang Xiaofeng 
 Governor of Hebei Province – Yue Qifeng
 Governor of Heilongjiang Province – Tian Fengshan then Song Fatang 
 Governor of Henan Province – Li Keqiang 
 Governor of Hubei Province – Jiang Zhuping 
 Governor of Hunan Province – Chu Bo 
 Governor of Jiangsu Province – Ji Yunshi
 Governor of Jiangxi Province – Shu Shengyou 
 Governor of Jilin Province – Hong Hu 
 Governor of Liaoning Province – Zhang Guoguang 
 Governor of Qinghai Province – Zhao Leji 
 Governor of Shaanxi Province – Cheng Andong 
 Governor of Shandong Province – Li Chunting
 Governor of Shanxi Province – Liu Zhenhua 
 Governor of Sichuan Province – Zhang Zhongwei 
 Governor of Yunnan Province – Li Jiating (until June), Xu Rongkai (starting June)
 Governor of Zhejiang Province – Chai Songyue

Events

January

 January 14 – 2000 Yunnan earthquake: An earthquake measuring 5.9 in magnitude occurred in the Yunnan province in southwest China, killing 7 people and injuring at least 2,528 more. Almost 41,000 homes were levelled by the earthquake.
 January – Baidu, an internet search engine, was founded.

October
 October 28 - Jiang Zemin berated Hong Kong journalist Sharon Cheung.

December
 December 25 – 2000 Luoyang Christmas fire: A shopping center fire at Luoyang, Henan, China kills 309.

Births
 March 12 - Sabrina Man, born in Hong Kong, is a Chinese-Filipina-Canadian actress, television host and commercial model.
 November 4 - Sun Yingsha, table tennis player.

Deaths
 January 8 – Ray Huang, a Chinese historian and philosopher (born 1918)
 May 22 – Zhao Puchu, Chinese Buddhist leader and social activists (born 1907)
 June 23 – Geng Biao, Chinese revolutionary, military strategist and diplomat (born 1909)

See also 
 2000 in Chinese film
 Hong Kong League Cup 2000–01

References 

 
China
Years of the 20th century in China
2000s in China
China